Dr. Albert Theodore William Simeons (1900 in London – 1970 in Rome) was the leading exponent of a weight-loss protocol based on human chorionic gonadotropin (hCG). In 1954, he published a book called "Pounds and Inches", and a paper in the Lancet on his theories.

Scientific consensus does not support Simeons's claims, finding no weight loss attributable to the use of hCG.

Publications 
The Mask of a Lion, 1952 (a novel)
Pounds & Inches a New Approach to Obesity, 1954
Man's Presumptuous Brain: An Evolutionary Interpretation of Psychosomatic Disease, 1961
Food: Facts, Foibles & Fables: The Origins of Human Nutrition, 1968

References 

1900 births
1970 deaths
20th-century British medical doctors
British endocrinologists
Diet food advocates
Heidelberg University alumni